The San Francisco Lesbian, Gay, Bisexual, and Transgender Pride Celebration (formerly International Lesbian & Gay Freedom Day, Gay Freedom Day, Christopher Street West), usually known as San Francisco Pride, is a parade and festival held at the end of June most years in San Francisco, California, to celebrate the lesbian, gay, bisexual, and transgender (LGBT) people and their allies. The 49th annual parade in 2019 included 289 parade contingents, and is described on the official website as "the largest gathering of LGBT people and allies in the nation".


Parade

The San Francisco Pride parade is an LGBT pride parade that is held on a Sunday morning as part of a two-day Festival. The route is usually west along San Francisco's Market Street, from Steuart Street to 8th Street and it runs from 10:30 am until almost 4:00 pm.  Participants line up off the parade route in advance of the start of the parade.

Contingents
The parade consists of hundreds of contingents from various groups and organizations. Some of the more well-known contingents are:

 Dykes on Bikes, formerly known as "Women's Motorcycle Contingent" for legal purposes, has several hundred motorcycle riders, almost all women-identified although they welcome all gender-variant people.  Some of the women are topless, some wear leather or fanciful costumes. The sound of hundreds of motorcycle engines gives this contingent a big impact. They are traditionally the first contingent in the parade; one reason for this is that it is difficult for motorcycles to run reliably at the walking pace of the rest of the parade, so as the first contingent they can move at an easier pace. On November 13, 2006, they won a battle to trademark the name "Dykes on Bikes", having struggled since 2003 to persuade the United States Patent and Trademark Office that "dyke" was not an offensive word. Founding member and activist, Soni Wolf was selected to serve as a Community Grand Marshal at the San Francisco Pride parade in 2018. Wolf died in April 2018 before she was able to serve as Community Grand Marshal. Her close friends will represent her in the parade by carrying the custom-painted motorcycle tank from the bike she rode during the inaugural ride in 1976.

 Parents, Families, and Friends of Lesbians and Gays (PFLAG), is usually one of the largest contingents, featuring several hundred people. These are typically the parents or family members of LGBT people, mostly straight, sometimes marching together with their LGBT relatives. Many carry signs indicating where their PFLAG chapter comes from. This contingent is notable for the emotion it generates along the route.
 Politicians frequently participate in the parade, as a way of making themselves visible to LGBT prospective voters.
 LGBT-affirming religious groups of many denominations contribute several dozen contingents.
 Nonprofit community groups and LGBT-oriented local businesses contribute more than half of the contingents. It is common for them to decorate a flatbed truck or float, along with loud dance music, or create a colorful contingent that carries a visual message out to the bystanders.

 The leather contingent consists of lesbian, gay, bisexual, transgender, and pansexual leather and BDSM groups.
 Many San Francisco companies have a contingent, sometimes chaptered by LGBT employees of the company, sometimes chaptered by the company as a community outreach or public relations effort to show support of LGBT causes.

During the 1990s it was common to see anti-gay protestors in the spectator area along the parade route, holding large signs condemning homosexuality, often with biblical passages. In the 2000s such protestors have become less common.

Hundreds of thousands of spectators line the parade route along Market Street. Some arrive hours in advance to claim a prime spot on the curb with a clear view of the street. Others climb onto bus shelters, the walls of subway station stairs, or scaffolding on buildings to get a clear view. As the parade ends, the spectators are able to pass through the barriers and march down Market street behind the parade. The end of the parade route is near the Festival location at the Civic Center.

Festival

A two-day (Saturday and Sunday) festival has grown up around the Sunday morning parade. It is a collection of booths, dance stages, and vendors around the Civic Center area near San Francisco City Hall. On the Sunday of the parade, an area of the festival called Leather Alley features fetish and BDSM oriented booths and demonstrations.

The festival is traditionally held in the last full weekend in June. This commemorates the Stonewall riots.

The independently organized Trans March is held on the Friday before the parade while the Dyke March and Trans March events are held on the Friday and Saturday nights preceding the march and rally in The Castro.

Administration
The festival is run by a non-profit organization, the San Francisco Lesbian, Gay, Bisexual, Transgender Pride Celebration Committee. According to their web site, their mission is "to educate the World, commemorate our heritage, celebrate our culture, and liberate our people."

The event is funded by a combination of community fundraising both by the pride committee and on their behalf, corporate sponsorships, San Francisco city grants, and donations collected from the participants at the festival.

Several veteran contractors are employed to take on specific roles for the event.

Also involved in the running of the festival and parade are hundreds of volunteers. Of particular note are:
 Safety monitors, crews of volunteers who help maintain order on the parade route and in the festival, particularly with respect to crowd control, and participant actions that might be harmful to themselves or others. Created in 1982, the Safety Committee philosophy and training has served as the model for many other LGBT events both local and international.
 Hospitality, a team of volunteers led annually by Davace Chin and Michael Fullam and charged with feeding the other volunteers, keeps hundreds coming back year after year.
 Medical volunteers, who provide first aid and medical assistance to participants. These volunteers are typically doctors, nurses, or other trained emergency response staff.
 Contingent monitors, members of the various contingents who maintain cohesion and safety in a their contingent. They are recruited and trained by the Parade leadership, by way of a contingent monitor training video posted on YouTube.

History

The first events resembling the modern San Francisco Pride parade and celebration were held on the last weekend of June 1970: Organized by the San Francisco Gay Liberation Front, a "Gay Liberation March" saw 20 to 30 people walk from Aquatic Park to Civic Center on Polk Street on Saturday, June 27. The following afternoon, a "Christopher Street Liberation Day Gay-In" brought some 200 people to Golden Gate Park; the gathering was raided by officers from the San Francisco Police Department on Hondas and on horseback, with seven people taken into custody at Park Station, then released without charges.

From 1972 until 2019, the event was held each year. The name of the festival has changed over the years. The event organizers each year select a theme for the event, which is reflected in the logo and the event's publicity.

The Rainbow Flag identified with the LGBT community was originally created by Gilbert Baker for the 1978 San Francisco Pride Parade. It originally had eight stripes, but was later simplified to the current six stripes. A six-stripe Rainbow Flag flies over Harvey Milk Plaza in the Castro, arguably the best known LGBT village in the world.

On August 3, 1997, Teddy Witherington (who previously organized the London LGBT Pride Event 1991–1997, including the first EuroPride Festival in 1992) was hired as the organization's first executive director. During his tenure, the celebration evolved into a multi-cultural festival and attracted support from high-profile celebrities and sponsors, including the B52s as Main Stage headliners in 2001 and Sir Ian McKellen as Grand Marshal in 2002. Witherington formally stepped down on January 6, 2006, and was succeeded by Lindsey Jones who had joined the staff in 2004. Jones served as executive director through the 2009 event.

In October 2009, LGBT activist Amy Andre was appointed as executive director of the San Francisco Pride Celebration Committee, making her San Francisco Pride's first openly bisexual woman of color executive director.

Also in 2009, Asexual Visibility and Education Network members participated in the first asexual entry into an American pride parade when they walked in the San Francisco Pride Parade. They have entered subsequent parades since.

Andre resigned a year later in October 2010 and was succeeded by former deputy executive director, Brendan Behan. Behan served as Executive Director April 2011 through December 2012 when Earl Plante was hired as CEO. Plante resigned September 6, 2013.

George Ridgely was hired to the position of Executive Director January 7, 2014 and served in that position until July 11, 2019.

In May 2015, Kent Anderson was hired as deputy executive director (resigned March 2017).

In 2016, Black Lives Matter and the TGI Justice Project withdrew from the parade in protest of increased police presence at the event.

In 2019, activists blocked the Pride parade route for almost an hour, in protest of police and corporate presence at the event.

In January 2020, Fred Lopez was named as the new executive director, having served in that position in an interim role since July 2019. Carolyn Wysinger serves as President of the board of directors. 

The 2020 and 2021 pride events were canceled due to the COVID-19 pandemic.

In 2022, Executive Director Fred Lopez stepped down, and Suzanne Ford, previously the Board Treasurer, became Interim Executive Director.

In 2022, the parade's concluding event at Civic Center was cut short by the organizers after a person was spraying mace near the stage, causing a panic, followed by multiple street brawls; however. 

 Several facts in this section are taken from "San Francisco LGBT Historical Timeline" by KQED (see External links). The themes of Pride festivals from 1970 to 2015 may be seen at San Francisco Pride website.

2013 Chelsea Manning controversy
On April 24, 2013, Pride announced that its electoral college had chosen U.S. Army Private First Class Chelsea (then known as Bradley) Manning, at the time imprisoned for leaking classified documents to WikiLeaks, as Community Grand Marshal in absentia for the 43rd annual Gay Pride Parade. Two days later, Pride's board president vetoed the election, declaring it "an error" due to a "systemic failure that now has become apparent and will be rectified." The board subsequently explained that the category in which Manning was elected is restricted to "a local hero (individual) not being a celebrity"—neither of which befit Manning.

Both the election and its nullification proved contentious. On April 29, an estimated 200 protesters disrupted the board's meeting, demanding that PFC Manning be reinstated. Supporters of Manning filed a complaint with the San Francisco Human Rights Commission. On May 12, the board said it would meet "in a larger venue after the 2013 Celebration and Parade [to] allow people from all sides of that issue and others to fully air and hear one another's viewpoints", but that it would not "let one issue, as important as it is to some, overshadow the concerns and interests of the hundreds of thousands who attend SF Pride." On May 18, SF Pride selected Bebe Sweetbriar as Community Grand Marshal. On June 7, 2013, the board announced that since none of the alternatives submitted at a May 31 community forum garnered a consensus majority, the board's decision to rescind PFC Manning's grand marshalship would stand. The board also reported that the San Francisco Human Rights Commission had declined to investigate the discrimination claims filed against SF Pride.

Notable performers

The B-52s
Joan Baez
Backstreet Boys
Sandra Bernhard
Betty Who
Big Freedia
Blush
BoA
Kimberly Caldwell
Colette Carr
Ryan Cassata
Margaret Cho
Chumbawamba
The Cliks
Kimberly Cole
Inaya Day
Deep Dark Robot
Dead or Alive
Kat DeLuna
En Vogue
Erasure
Exposé
Rochelle Fleming
Kat Graham
Jennifer Holliday
Janis Ian
Erika Jayne
Grace Jones
Karmin
Kehlani
Kerli
Chaka Khan
Solange Knowles
Lady Bunny
Lady Gaga
Lady Miss Kier
Amara La Negra
Lime
Lisa Lisa
Luciana
The Motels
Myra
Me'shell Ndegeocello
Neon Trees
Pansy Division
CeCe Peniston
The Pointer Sisters
Rose Royce
The Ssion
Jessica Sutta
Sylvester
Third Eye Blind
Gloria Trevi
Ultra Naté
Martha Wash
Crystal Waters
Pabllo Vittar
The Weather Girls

See also

 Dyke March
 Trans March
 Pink Saturday, a separate celebration held in the Castro on Saturday night of SF Pride.
 LGBT culture in San Francisco

Notes

References

Further reading 
  (Book published by True North Editions, with   Introduction by Victoria Sheridan, and essay by Janet Kornblum.)

External links

 
  Gay Freedom Day Committee (San Francisco) Records, 1973-1991, Online Archive of California, California Digital Library.
  San Francisco LGBT Historical Timeline (pre-1930–2008), KQED. (Archive)

Photo galleries

2016 S.F. Pride photo gallery
2011 S.F. Pride photo gallery
2010 S.F. Pride photo gallery
2010 S.F. Pride music video (Champagne Mouth)
2008 S.F. Pride photo gallery
2007 S.F. Pride photo gallery
2008 Pride parade photo gallery
2007 parade photo gallery
2006 parade photo gallery
2005 parade photo gallery
2004 parade photo gallery
2003 parade photo gallery
Shooter.net -- Photos of 2007 San Francisco Parade
Shooter.net -- Photos of 2005 San Francisco Parade
2005 Pride parade photo gallery
2004 Pride parade photo gallery
2003 Pride parade photo gallery

1972 in San Francisco
Annual events in California
Culture of San Francisco
Festivals in the San Francisco Bay Area
LGBT culture in San Francisco
Pride parades in California